Freud (aka Freud's) is a café-bar in a Victorian former church building at 119 Walton Street in Jericho, Oxford, England.

The Freud café is located opposite Great Clarendon Street and the Oxford University Press is also opposite to the south. It is surrounded by the Radcliffe Observatory Quarter of the University of Oxford, formerly the Radcliffe Infirmary site.

The Freud café is housed in the former St Paul's Church, a Greek Revival building designed in 1836 by Henry Jones Underwood. The church was inspired by an outbreak of cholera in the area in 1831. The building has an imposing portico with Ionic columns. The architect Edward George Bruton added the apse in 1853 and Frederick Charles Eden remodelled the interior in 1908.

In the 20th century, the church became redundant and was closed in the late 1960s. After deconsecration, the building was bought by the Oxford Area Arts Council and used as a theatre and arts centre venue. In 1988, the building was acquired by Secession Ltd to prevent the building's demolition. Freud opened as a café/bar in the same year. The cafe was created by David Freud, a graduate of the Courtauld Institute of Art, who has an interest in buildings  and their interaction with people.

There is sometimes live music, such as jazz, punk, post-punk or blues. The name is often written in Roman-style capital lettering as "FREVD", for example above the main entrance door.

In 2015, a new building for the Blavatnik School of Government of Oxford University on the Radcliffe Observatory Quarter site was opened immediately to the south of Freud. The scheme was opposed by the cafe's owner, David Freud, due to its size and height compared to the church building.

There is another Freud café-bar in London.

See also
 List of Italian restaurants

References

External links
 

Commercial buildings completed in 1836
1988 establishments in England
Restaurants in Oxfordshire
Italian restaurants in the United Kingdom
Coffeehouses and cafés in the United Kingdom
Former churches in Oxford
Former theatres in England
Arts centres in England
Greek Revival architecture in the United Kingdom
Culture in Oxford